The Japanese calendar era bug is a possible computer bug related to the change of Japanese era name.

Background 

The Japanese calendar has era names that change with the reign of the Japanese emperor. Since most of the modern age of computing has occurred in the Heisei era, much of the software has support limited to that era.

A new era name was expected with the 2019 Japanese imperial transition. However, since the change of eras is infrequent, most software has not been tested to ensure that it will behave correctly with an additional era. To ensure that the new era will be handled correctly, some systems were provided test mechanisms to simulate a new era ahead of time.

In early April 2019, the new era name was announced to be Reiwa for "beautiful harmony."

Documented errors 
Some minor problems have been reported due to improper handling of the era transition.
 ATMs placed inside the Lawson chain of konbini reported that due to a banking holiday funds deposited would not be available until May 7, 1989, due to a date conversion improperly using Heisei 1 (1989) instead of Reiwa 1 (2019).

Planned fixes 

 Windows 10 version 1803 includes a registry entry with placeholder information for the expected era transition, intended to help users discover any software limitations around the expected change to the new era.
 Unicode code point U+32FF has been reserved in September 2018 for representing the new era name and Unicode 12.1 finally includes the U+32FF character for Reiwa.
 The GNU C Library patch will be included in the 2.30 release.

See also 
 Time formatting and storage bugs
 2019 Japanese imperial transition

References 

 
 

Calendars
Software bugs
Time formatting and storage bugs